Eduard Konstantinovich Izotov (Russian: Эдуа́рд Константи́нович Изо́тов) (11 November 1936 - 8 March 2003) was a Soviet film actor.

Izotov was born in the Belarusian SSR near Surazh. His parents were Konstantin Iosifovich Izotov and Anna Iosifovna Izotova. He studied acting at the Gerasimov Institute of Cinematography between 1954 and 1959, and in 1959 made his film debut in Sergei Kazakov's In the Silence of the Steppe (V stepnoy tishi). In 1964 he starred as the young hero Ivanushka in the fairy-tale film Jack Frost, the role for which he is best known today.

Izotov enjoyed a successful film career until 1983, when he was implicated in a scheme hatched by some fellow artists to finance a dacha by illegal means. During the trial, he was defended by many distinguished colleagues, among them Pyotr Glebov, Nikolai Kryuchkov, Oleg Strizhenov, and Marina Ladynina. Nevertheless, he was sentenced to three years in prison. The experience was devastating for the sensitive Izotov, and left him in poor health and psychologically damaged. After his release, he had trouble finding work, and suffered from chronic ill health. In 1999 he was honored as a Meritorious Artist of the Russian Federation. He died in 2003 in Moscow, and was buried in the northern suburb of Khimki.

From 1956 to 1980 he was married to Inga Budkevich, a fellow veteran of Alexander Rou's fairy tale films who went on to have a long career in Soviet and Russian cinema. Their daughter, Veronika Izotova (born 1960), also became an actress.

Filmography

References

External links
 
 Eduard Izotov's entry on kinopoisk.ru

1936 births
2003 deaths
Russian male film actors
People from Vitebsk Region